Vedaranyam taluk is a taluk of Nagapattinam district of the Indian state of Tamil Nadu. The headquarters of the taluk is the town of Vedaranyam

Demographics
According to the 2011 census, the taluk of Vedaranyam had a population of 215,653 with 107,007 males and 108,646 females. There were 1,015 women for every 1,000 men. The taluk had a literacy rate of 76.14%. Child population in the age group below 6 was 9,589 Males and 9,083 Females.

Villages 
 
 
Katharipulam
Pushpavanam
Thulasiypattinam

References 

Taluks of Nagapattinam district